Joe Roberts (born 10 May 2000) is a Welsh rugby union player, currently playing for Pro14 and European Rugby Champions Cup side Scarlets. His preferred position is centre.

Scarlets
Roberts signed his first professional contract for the Scarlets in August 2020. In March 2021, he joined RFU Championship side  on loan. He made his debut on 7 March against , scoring a try. He would go on to make a further 5 appearances before returning to the Scarlets.

References

External links
itsrugby.co.uk Profile

2000 births
Living people
Rugby union centres
Rugby union players from Swansea
Scarlets players
Welsh rugby union players
Ampthill RUFC players